Jim Walmsley (born January 17, 1990) is an American long-distance runner. An ultra-trail specialist, his wins include the JFK 50 Mile in 2014, 2015 and 2016, the Lake Sonoma 50 in 2016 and 2018, the Tarawera Ultramarathon in 2017, and the Western States 100 in 2018, 2019, and 2021. He holds several course records and fastest known times, including the Western States 100, set in 2018 and further improved by 21 minutes in 2019. Sponsored by Hoka One One, Walmsley was named UltraRunner of the Year for four years in a row - 2016, 2017, 2018 and 2019. In addition, he qualified and ran in the 2020 Olympic trials in the marathon with his 2019 qualifying performance at the Houston half-marathon.  While competing in the Hoka One One Project Carbon X 100K Challenge on May 5, 2019 he set a new world best for the 50 mile distance, completing it in 4:50:07 (besting Bruce Fordyce's previous 36-year old record by 14 seconds). Walmsley won the World Long Distance Mountain Running Championships in 2019.

Career

High school 
Walmsley attended Horizon High School in Scottsdale, Arizona. In his senior year in 2007, he became Arizona's Division 5A-II cross country state champion, winning every race he ran in, and was named Runner of the Year. He finished 23rd in the national championships that year.

College 
He considered attending Arizona State, Georgetown, Iona College, Washington, California and the Air Force Academy, eventually choosing the latter. During his 4 years there, from 2008 to 2012, he ran cross country and also took part in the 5000 meters, 10,000 meters, and steeplechase. In 2012, as the captain of the cross country and long-distance running teams, his best times were 4:04 for the mile, 13:52 for 5000m, 29:08 for 10000m and 8:41 for the 3000m steeplechase.

Achievements

Records

References

External links
 Jim Walmsley Official Website

1990 births
Living people
American male long-distance runners
American male ultramarathon runners
Track and field athletes from Arizona
World Long Distance Mountain Running Championships winners
Sportspeople from Phoenix, Arizona
Sportspeople from Scottsdale, Arizona